The Bentway, formerly Project: Under Gardiner, is a public trail and corridor space underneath the Gardiner Expressway in Toronto, Ontario, Canada. It is repurposed land that was in sections vacant , rail lines, parking lots and outdoor storage.

History

The initial idea to transform the underside of the Gardiner Expressway into a public space came from Judy Matthews, a local Toronto urban planner and activist. On November 17, 2015, after the city's mayor approved the park initiative, Matthews donated  million for the park to the City of Toronto government through the Judy and Wilmot Matthews Foundation. The donation represented one of the most significant gifts in Toronto's history, and it was hoped that it would inspire other Torontonians to make similar philanthropic contributions to city-building initiatives. Waterfront Toronto, a revitalization agency representing the governments of Toronto, Ontario and Canada, was brought on board to collaborate with the city, along with Ken Greenberg Consultants Incorporated and Public Work to manage project planning and design.

The project was given the working name "Project: Under Gardiner". A public naming contest was launched in March 2016, and the public submitted 884 different name suggestions. A panel of 12 artists, policy experts and community leaders took the suggestions and whittled them down to a shortlist of four names: "The Artery," "The Bentway," "The Canopy," and "Gathering Place." The public voting between these four options occurred between April 28 and May 8, 2016. The Bentway remained a firm leader throughout the vote with The Artery behind in second place by 10 percentage points, but in the last hours before voting closed, Waterfront Toronto observed a surge in votes for The Artery. The legitimacy of the votes was questioned, and a second runoff vote was held between The Bentway and The Artery. On June 6, 2016, The Bentway was revealed as the new official winner of the naming contest.

Construction of the Bentway was completed in phases, with the first phase opened on January 6, 2018, including a winter skating trail.

Layout
It also consists of 55 outdoor separate civic areas referred to as "rooms," which hosts activities such as farmer's markets, gardens, performance theatres and exhibition halls, spanning three main sections. The Bentway spans six Toronto neighbourhoods with a total of 77,000 residents: Liberty Village, Niagara, Fort York, Fashion District, CityPlace, and Harbourfront.

West
The west end of The Bentway spans Exhibition Place and Fort York, and is bisected by Strachan Avenue. The Hall of Making and the Innovation Hub, located west of Strachan Avenue, utilizes enclosed portions under the Gardiner that are used as storage space. A new green space to the north, Pioneering Green, includes a playground and urban agriculture. At Strachan Avenue, the trail is grade separated underneath, but the Strachan Steps provide stair and switchback access to the street. The trail proceeds east through the Active Hub, which provide various arts and entertainment space.

Fort Central
The centre section of The Bentway spans the Fort York neighbourhood. The trail proceeds along the Fort Front, where natural and recreation spaces are provided. A bridge called the Iconic Crossing then carries the trail across Fort York Boulevard, immediately east of June Callwood Park. The trail then enters the Passive Hub, a water-themed area, and then crosses Bathurst Street.

East
The east section of The Bentway stretches between Bathurst Street and Spadina Avenue. East of Bathurst, the Market Hub provides a market setting next to a former Loblaws warehouse and headquarters. The trail then crosses Dan Leckie Way, and along the south end of Canoe Landing Park.

Winter Skating 
In the winter, part of The Bentway is converted into a public ice skating trail.

References

 White, Richard (2003). Urban infrastructure and urban growth in the Toronto region, 1950s to the 1990s. Toronto, Ontario: Neptis Foundation. .

External links
 Official Site

Parks in Toronto
2018 establishments in Ontario
Waterfront Toronto